Invitation  is an album by Philadelphia, Pennsylvania jazz drummer Norman Connors, released in 1979. The album charted at number 137 on the Billboard top albums chart and number 34 on the Billboard soul albums chart.

Track listing
 Your Love – 5:06
 Handle Me Gently – 3:47
 Be There in the Morning – 4:15
 Invitation – 4:06
 Together – 3:14
 Disco Land – 4:34
 I Have a Dream – 6:18
 Beijo Partido – 6:01
 Kingston – 4:24

Charts

References

External links
 

1979 albums
Norman Connors albums
Arista Records albums